Michael "Mike" Ian Van Patrick is a fictional character appearing in American comic books published by Marvel Comics.

Publication history 
The character was created by Dan Slott and Stefano Caselli. Although the character died in his debut appearance, he was cloned after his death and his clones continued to play roles within the ongoing Avengers: The Initiative series.

Described by Slott as an archetypal "all-American boy", the character is introduced in the pages of Avengers: The Initiative #1 as the great-grandson of Dr. Abraham Erskine, the inventor of the super soldier serum within Marvel Comics' shared universe the Marvel Universe.

The first clone was sent back to Van Patrick's parent's home to prevent them from discovering his death. The next three clones, named Michael, Van and Patrick, originally worked as the Scarlet Spiders, as part of the Black Ops group within The Initiative. They were revealed to be clones in Avengers: The Initiative #7. He was cloned once more, in the Killed in Action story arc when some of the vacant positions in the Initiative teams were filled with MVP clones.

The original's only appearance outside the pages of Avengers: The Initiative was a brief cameo in an alternate reality What If comic. All that is known about the original character has been revealed in that series, with Van Patrick's (and the first sets of clones) origins being shown in the 2007 Avengers: The Initiative Annual. However, the Scarlet Spiders (Michael and Patrick) became the first clones to appear outside The Initiative when they appeared in New Warriors vol. 4 #14 (Sept. 2008). The first MVP clone appeared in the following issue of the New Warriors series.

Fictional character biography
Michael Van Patrick origins trace back to scientist "Dr. Josef Reinstein" later retroactively changed to a code name for the scientist Abraham Erskine, the developer of the Super-Soldier serum that changed the frail Steve Rogers into Timely Comics's (Marvel Comics' 1940s predecessor's) Captain America. On his death, Dr. Erskine left papers, which covered years of research and findings that the government had not seen fit to classify to his grandson Brian Van Patrick. Brian studied his grandfather's work, particularly his work on growing, preparing and serving the most wholesome and nutritional foods and a challenging experimental program of isometric exercises. Brian used the research during the early life and development of his son Michael, helping him achieve his potential.

The events of the 2006–2007 Marvel Comics crossover Civil War required all United States superpowered individuals to register with the American government, with at least some of these individuals being sent to The Initiative's training camp Camp Hammond. Given Michael's descent from the creator of the super soldier serum, many people came to suspect his athletic abilities to be superpower-related. He lost his university scholarship when media revealed that his great-grandfather was Dr. Abraham Erskine.

He joined the program under the codename MVP, along with old and new characters to make up the cast of the Avengers: The Initiative. During the first day of training at Camp Hammond, MVP demonstrated extraordinary speed and agility as he broke the camp's obstacle course record for users without superspeed on his first attempt.

During a combat simulator exercise, Initiative trainee Armory ended up panicking and fired blindly on the other recruits. MVP saved fellow recruit Cloud 9. While saving Cloud 9, MVP is shot in the head, killing him instantly.

Initiative scientist (and former Nazi and supervillain) Dr. Baron Von Blitzschlag performed the autopsy on Michael's body. The autopsy revealed that MVP's extraordinary physical abilities were unconnected to the super-soldier serum and were instead achieved by natural means. Von Blitzschlag advocated cloning MMV to chief administrator Yellowjacket's disapproval. In Avengers: The Initiative #22, the members of New Warriors take possession of Michael's body to return him home.

First clone 
Though Yellowjacket disapproved the idea of cloning MVP, Secretary of the Superhuman Armed Forces Henry Peter Gyrich had ordered that MVP's death remain secret and sanctioned the cloning. As Van Patrick was a non-altered human, Yellowjacket considered the cloning to be comparatively easy.

Avengers: The Initiative Annual #1 reveals the clone's creation and development. As the clone was grown to its original's age, all of his original's skills and abilities were programmed into him with the help of a special suit with telemetry circuits, a video of MVP's training session, and the photographic reflexes of Taskmaster. The first clone is sent to his family's organic vegetable farm in Liberty, Kentucky, with a false story that he had failed the Initiative program because of his lack of powers. The clone, who is coming to realize that his memories are not his own and that he will never be the real Michael Van Patrick, elects to stay with "his" family. He is warned however to never tell them that he is not their real son.

However, the clone's first appearance was a couple of months prior in a few panels of Avengers: The Initiative #4, where Justice and Cloud 9, not knowing that clones had replaced Michael, flew to the Van Patrick farm to inform MVP's parents of his death. On arriving, they are greeted at the door by the clone but are called off to deal with the events of World War Hulk before they can inquire further. In a later issue, Justice returns with Cloud 9 to the Van Patrick home, wishing to find out what information Gyrich and Yellowjacket were keeping from him. On arriving, they find the house boarded up and abandoned.

During the Killed In Action storyline, it is revealed that the clone has an imbedded tracking device and that the Van Patrick family had moved to Bulls Gap, Tennessee. In this storyline's conclusion, the clone then helps The Initiative stop KIA and begins to further MVP's romantic interest in Cloud 9. In Avengers: The Initiative #12, the MVP clone, along with the surviving Scarlet Spiders and MVP's father, join with Justice's New Warriors as a Counter Initiative of underground registered heroes. MVP, as a part of Counter Force, would go on to appear in New Warriors vol. 4 #14-15; in the character's first appearance outside of an Avengers: The Initiative title.

Scarlet Spiders

Three more clones, developed the same time as the first but with added genetic material from Baron Von Blitzschlage, were programmed via input from Taskmaster with MVP's skills and abilities along with those of Spider-Man. The three clones, Michael, Van and Patrick (sometimes referred to as "Pat"), were suited up in redesigned Iron Spider suits that Spider-Man had worn during the early stages of the superhero Civil War.

During their first appearance, they identify themselves as the "Red Team" and take down supervillains Shocker, Boomerang and Hydro-Man. Though War Machine identifies them by their official name Scarlet Spiders when contacting them, they identify themselves as Red Team One (Michael), Red Team Two (Van), and Red Team Three ("Pat" Patrick) in the field. They are later revealed to be part of the Shadow Initiative black ops group under the command of Gyrich with Constrictor, Mutant Zero, Bengal, and Trauma.

The Scarlet Spiders were forced to expose themselves to the public in Avengers: The Initiative #7 after an attack on Blitzschlage. The subsequent pursuit of three criminals wearing the Vulturions flying exosuits would lead the Spiders into confronting the angry Peter Parker. Their appearance in a battle against and alongside Parker raised public doubts over whether Parker is the original and/or only Spider-Man, despite his having publicly revealing his dual identity in the early events of the Civil War.

Now public, the Scarlet Spiders join with the other initiative trainees in the next issue. An incident involving Dragon Man leads one of the Spiders to save Cloud 9 in much the same fashion as the original MVP did at the time of his death. In Avengers: The Initiative #10, the Scarlet Spiders unmask themselves in an attempt to calm the enraged clone KIA only to have him behead one of their number. The surviving (and still unmasked) Scarlet Spiders, Michael and Patrick, are later seen by the majority of the trainees, including Cloud 9. In Avengers: The Initiative #11, the remaining Scarlet Spiders make their way to Bulls Gap, Tennessee to aid in the capture of KIA.

In Avengers: The Initiative #12, after the defeat of KIA, the surviving Scarlet Spiders, along with the MVP clone and the real MVP's father, join with Justice's New Warriors as a Counter Initiative/Counter Force of underground registered heroes who go on to appear in New Warriors Secret Invasion tie-in story "Secrets and Skrulls" where Counter Force would team up with the other team of New Warriors. Reappearing within the pages of Avengers: The Initiative #21, with Norman Osborn taking control of the 50-State Initiative, Counter Force were made wanted criminals. The team shows up at Camp Hammond, having retaken the name New Warriors to battle the rampaging Ragnarok. In Avengers: The Initiative #22, Scarlet Spider Michael is killed by Ragnarok. During the next issue, in the battle's aftermath, the last surviving Scarlet Spider Patrick publicly unmasks himself, revealing to the media that the Initiative had secretly cloned MVP.

He continues to defy Osborn with the Avengers Resistance, and even participates in the attack on Camp HAMMER during the siege of Asgard. He is seen again with the New Warriors during the Fear Itself crossover.

KIA

The results of the previous clonings impressed Initiative administrators enough to attempt to fill places within the Fifty-State Initiative with further clones. In the Avengers: The Initiative first multi-part story; Killed in Action (starting issue #8), a new clone is fitted with the Tactigon, Armory's former alien weapon and sets forth on a murderous rampage through Camp Hammond in an attempt to seek revenge for MVP's death.

In the second part First Casualties, set before the events of the first, the clone, who is distinguished by his whited out eyes, is said to have had Armory's moves programmed into him in preparation to use the Omega-Level weapon that killed the original MVP. The Tactigon interfaces with this clone's mind activating latent memories of the real MVP's death. Hacking into the Initiative's computer, the clone learns of his "death" and gains a list of all those present at the time. The disturbed clone demolishes the cloning lab, attacking Blitzschlag and Yellowjacket while repeating "Killed in Action" over and over again and carving the initials "KIA" into his chest. The clone continues its rampage through Camp Hammond, striking those whose names are on his list and attacking anyone else who gets in the way.

At the end of the third part, the clone attempts to find the comatose Gauntlet, the drill instructor who had sent MVP to the ill-fated combat training session. However, Gauntlet's weapon, which was taken from an alien who faced off against the alien who controlled the Tactigon in Gauntlet and Armory's origin stories, seemingly takes control of Gauntlet's body forcing him to acquire the sword element of the alien's armor that he recovered when he originally bonded with the alien glove device. The two later battle and KIA stabs Gauntlet to bring him out of his coma, in an effort to face the man rather than the gauntlet weapon.

In the concluding part of the Worst Case Scenario storyline, KIA battles his way through the Initiative to follow trainees Cloud 9, Komodo and Hardball to MVP's first clone in Bulls Gap, where they are attempting to convince the clone to download its memories into a device (and most likely leave himself brain-dead) which could then upload them into KIA to reset his mind. After arriving at the location, KIA is met by the collective Initiative force of the Mighty Avengers, the remaining Scarlet Spiders, a rogue New Warriors group and the trainees. In the battle's climax, the first clone uses the device to download KIA's memories leaving his body brain-dead. After the battle, it is revealed that the Avengers have stored both the body and the Tactigon away in an undisclosed location, before which Slapstick secretly took the device with KIA's memories from the battlefield for himself, which reads "ready to transmit brain patterns to new host body" leaving KIA's eventual fate open-ended.

Many trainees and staff members were injured during KIA's rampage, but only Dragon Lord, Trauma, Van (one of the Scarlet Spiders) and 8 S.H.I.E.L.D. agents were killed. But in Avengers: The Initiative #12, Trauma came back to life.

Powers, abilities and equipment
In Avengers: The Initiative #2, Von Blitzschlag refers to MVP as an "Übermensch", a perfect human specimen, down to the cellular level. This perfection is displayed in his physical abilities. He reaches the highest possible standard for a human being without becoming a enhanced super-soldier. Yellowjacket (actually the Skrull agent Criti Noll), one of the chief administrators at Camp Hammond, ironically referred to MVP as "Captain America, Jr." in the first issue of Avengers: The Initiative. However, unlike Captain America's enhanced condition, MVP's abilities were revealed in the Avengers: The Initiative Annual to have come as a result of the "revolutionary" diet and an "ultimate" isometric exercise regime he completed, rather than Dr. Erskine's super-soldier serum.

The first clone has those same abilities, with the Scarlet Spiders additionally having the skills, reflexes/reactions and moves of Spider-Man programmed into them to the limit of regular human ability.

Michael, Van and Patrick's Scarlet Spider suits, a redesign of Tony Stark's Iron Spider armor (previously used by Spider-Man), are supported by systems similar to that of Stark's classic Iron Man design. In the Scarlet Spider's first appearance, Avengers: The Initiative #3, the suit features several devices, including four mechanical spider-arms or "waldoes" on each suit, one more than on the original, along with cloaking devices and a short-range GPS microwave communication system. In Avengers: The Initiative #7, the suits display mechanical web-shooters while retaining the ability to change appearance to other versions of the Spider-Man costume or street clothes. In New Warriors vol. 4 #15 (Oct. 2008), it was revealed the suits have had their StarkTech removed, which prevented the suits being affected when all StarkTech was made inoperable by Skrull invaders. However, this is seemingly retconned in a line spoken by one of the Spiders: "should be StarkTech like ours, but it's so alien", in Avengers: The Initiative #22, when the Spiders interface with other technology.

Attached to the "KIA" Michael Van Patrick is Armory's former weapon, known as the Tactigon, which was detached when she was expelled from the Initiative program. It is a multi-dimensional alien device that, once attached to a body, is able to shift into an infinite number of weapons and tools with a built-in safety designed to only enable the wearer to wield the specific weapons/tools needed to get the job at hand done.

Reception

The IGN reviewer considered MVP to be one of the "instantly likable characters" in the first issue, while a Comics Bulletin reviewer expanded on this by saying MVP especially "could help carry this title". However, MVP's death at the end of the issue was met with concern "while shocking, [MVP's death] undermines the advancement of the rest of the issue". Despite concerns that writer Dan Slott had cavalierly killed MVP, IGN reviewer stated that "having seen the emotional fallout of that incident, I can see why it was so important to do that. Clearly the death in the first issue added immeasurable weight to the situation".

MVP also received criticism from TheGamer reviewer, Charlie Green, stating that MVP hurt the Marvel comics involving him, "This is essentially what would have happened if nothing particularly exciting happened to [Captain America]".

See also

Avengers: The Initiative
Captain America
Scarlet Spider

References

External links

MVP at Marvel.com Universe
MVP at Marvel Database wiki
Scarlet Spiders (Team Red) at Marvel Database wiki

Characters created by Dan Slott
Clone characters in comics
Comics characters introduced in 2007
Fictional characters from Kentucky
Marvel Comics superheroes